Álfhildr was the name of several women in Norse mythology and legend. The name is composed of Old Norse words, alf 'elf, fairy' and hildr 'battle'. As of 2010 it was common in Norway.

Alfhild (Saxon princess), a Saxon princess and Danish queen from Book One of Gesta Danorum
Alfhild, concubine of Olaf II of Norway, mother of Magnus the Good
Álfhildr (Gautreks saga), the daughter of king Harald of Wendland and wife of Geatish king Gautrekr
Alfhild, daughter of the Geatish king Siward; see Alf and Alfhild
Alfhild, daughter of Vingulmark king Gandalf Alfgeirsson

References

Norwegian feminine given names